Carlee Hoffman (born July 10, 1986) is an American wheelchair basketball player from Cutlerville, Michigan. She plays the power forward position and was a gold medalist for the United States in the 2004 Summer Paralympics in Athens and in the 2008 Summer Paralympics in Beijing.  Hoffman is a bilateral below-knee amputee.

Major achievements 
 2006:  Silver medal - IWBF Gold Cup (World Championships), Amsterdam, The Netherlands
 2004:  Gold medal - Paralympic Games, Athens, Greece

External links 
 U.S. Paralympics: Biography
 Fighting Illini Wheelchair Basketball: Biography

1986 births
Living people
American women's wheelchair basketball players
Wheelchair basketball players at the 2004 Summer Paralympics
Paralympic wheelchair basketball players of the United States
Paralympic gold medalists for the United States
American amputees
Medalists at the 2004 Summer Paralympics
Medalists at the 2008 Summer Paralympics
Wheelchair basketball players at the 2008 Summer Paralympics
Power forwards (basketball)
Paralympic medalists in wheelchair basketball
21st-century American women
20th-century American women